Falacrine ( or) was a village of Ancient Rome that was the birthplace of the emperor Vespasian (9–79 AD).

Location
The location of Falacrine has been the subject of debate. The village is described as lying just beyond Reate (modern Rieti), in the Sabine hill country northeast of Rome. According to local tradition before the 16th century, it was on the site of the castle of Alatri, between Greccio and Contigliano. However, local historian Mariano Vittori believed that Falacrine lay near Cittareale, in the province of Rieti. Latini found ruins in Collicelle, a  frazione of Cittareale that he thought were Falacrine. However, in Amatrice it's believed that Falacrine lies in the frazione of Torrita, above the valley of the same name. Others have suggested that it lies in Antrodoco, Rieti or Paganico Sabino.

In 2009, archaeologists unearthed a large  first-century villa near Cittareale that they identified as Falacrine.

References 
 Atti Del Congresso Internazionale Di Studi Vespasianei (Italian language article on the location of Falacrine)

Roman towns and cities in Italy

it:Falacrine